Magyar Atlétikai Club (English: Hungarian Athletic Club) is a Hungarian football club from the city of Budapest.

History

Magyar AC debuted in the 1903 season of the Hungarian League and finished seventh.

Name Changes 
1875–1945: Magyar Athletikai Club
1928: the football department was dissolved
1988–1993: Magyar Athletikai Club
1993: merger with Népstadion Szabadidő Egyesület
1993–2011: MAC Népstadion SE
2011–2013: Magyar Athletikai Club
2013: merger with Grund 1986 FC

Honours
Hungarian Cup:
 Runner-up (1): 1910–11

 Challenge Cup:
 Runner-up (1): 1904–05

References

External links
 Profile

Football clubs in Hungary
1875 establishments in Hungary